Hesperolaburnum platycarpum is a species of flowering plants in the family Fabaceae. It belongs to the subfamily Faboideae. It is the only member of the genus Hesperolaburnum.

References

Genisteae
Monotypic Fabaceae genera